The men's omnium competition of the cycling events at the 2019 Pan American Games was held on August 1 at the Velodrome.

Schedule

Results

Scratch
The race was started at 12:08.

Tempo Race
The race was started at 13:08.

Elimination
The race was started at 18:05.

Points Race
The race was started at 19:27.

Final standings
The final classification is determined overall standings.

References

Track cycling at the 2019 Pan American Games
Men's omnium